Lupoglav can refer to:

 Lupoglav, Istria County, a village and a municipality in Croatia
 Lupoglav, Zagreb County, a village in the Brckovljani municipality, Croatia
 Lupoglav, Žepče, a village in Bosnia and Herzegovina

See also
 Lepoglava